The 1988 Furman Paladins football team represented Furman University as a member of the Southern Conference (SoCon) during the 1988 NCAA Division I-AA football season. In their third year under head coach Jimmy Satterfield, the Paladins compiled an overall record of 13–2 with a conference mark of 6–1, sharing the SoCon title with Mashall. Furman advanced to the NCAA Division I-AA Football Championship playoffs, where they defeated Delware in the first round, Marshall in the quarterfinals, Idaho in the semifinals, and Georgia Southern in the NCAA Division I-AA Championship Game.

Schedule

References

Furman
Furman Paladins football seasons
NCAA Division I Football Champions
Southern Conference football champion seasons
Furman Paladins football